Discontinuity and continuity according to Michel Foucault reflect the flow of history and the fact that some "things are no longer perceived, described, expressed, characterised, classified, and known in the same way" from one era to the next. (1994).

Explanation 
In developing the theory of archaeology of knowledge, Foucault was trying to analyse the fundamental codes which a culture uses to construct the episteme or configuration of knowledge that determines the empirical orders and social practices of each particular historical era. He adopted discontinuity as a positive working tool. Some of the discourse would be regular and continuous over time as knowledge steadily accumulates and society gradually establishes what will constitute truth or reason for the time being. But, in a transition from one era to the next, there will be overlaps, breaks and discontinuities as society reconfigures the discourse to match the new environment. 

The tool is given an expanded role in genealogy, the next phase of discourse analysis, where the intention is to grasp the total complexity of the use of power and the effects it produces. Foucault sees power as the means for constituting individuals’ identities and determining the limits of their autonomy. This reflects the symbiotic relationship between power (pouvoir) and knowledge (savoir). In his study of prisons and hospitals, he observed how the modern individual becomes both an object and subject of knowledge. Science emerges as a means of directing and shaping lives. Hence, the modern conception of sexuality emerges from Christian codes of morality, the science of psychology, the laws and enforcement strategies adopted by the police and judiciary, the way in which issues of sexuality are discussed in the public media, the education system, etc. These are covert forms of domination (if not oppression), and their influence is to be found not only in what is said, but more importantly, in what is not said: in all the silences and lacunae, in all the discontinuities. If one idea is discussed, then it is not discussed, whose interest is served by this change?

References 
Foucault, M. The Order of Things: An Archaeology of the Human Sciences. Vintage; Reissue edition (1964) 

Postmodern theory
Post-structuralism
Social philosophy
Structuralism
Michel Foucault